Hulverstone is a hamlet of about 12 houses on the Isle of Wight on the edge of the English Channel. It has a post office in a private home and the 400-year-old Sun Inn. Sun Inn was used in smuggling operations. There is a school in Hulverstone in a private home that had been a barn before it was converted in the mid-19th century by Charles Seely. According to the Post Office the population of the hamlet at the 2011 Census was included in the civil parish of Brighstone.

There was a Hulverstone farm but it no longer exists. The manor house is still used as a private home, however.

The Chapel Furlong Farm in Hulverstone is the site of a bed and breakfast.

Public transport is provided by Southern Vectis buses on route 12.

Notes

Hamlets on the Isle of Wight
Brighstone